Maletić is a surname. Notable people with the surname include:

Darko Maletić (born 1980), Bosnia and Herzegovina footballer
Ivana Maletić (born 1973), Croatian politician
Marko Maletić (footballer, born 1993), Bosnia and Herzegovina footballer
Marko Maletic (soccer, born 1999), Canadian soccer player
Sanja Maletić (born 1973), Serbian singer
Stefan Maletić (born 1987), Dutch footballer

Croatian surnames
Serbian surnames